Silkeborg-Hallerne is a complex of indoor sports arenas in Silkeborg, Denmark used for several sports, but primarily handball. The arena is home to Danish Handball League team Bjerringbro-Silkeborg.

In 2014 gets Silkeborg-Hallerne a renovation that made the hall 600 square meters large and 14 meters long. Besides a large hall was floors, light engineering, stands and big screen replaced. In addition, the hall was renamed Jysk Arena as Jysk was main sponsor of the rebuilding

Handball venues in Denmark
Indoor arenas in Denmark
Silkeborg Municipality